Francis Reitz may refer to:
 Francis Joseph Reitz (1841–1930), American banker from Indiana
 FJ Reitz High School, founded in 1918
 Reitz Memorial High School, founded in 1925
 Francis William Reitz (1844–1934), South African politician and son of below
 Francis William Reitz Sr. (1810–1881), South African politician and father of above

Reitz, Francis